The Thai FA Cup 2009 was the 16th season of Thailand knockout football competition. The competition started on 27 June 2009 and concluded with the Final on 21 October 2009. It was the first time the competition was held in 8 years. The tournament is organized by the Football Association of Thailand.

The cup winner were guaranteed a place in the 2010 AFC Cup.

Qualifying round
All of the 28 teams came from Division 2, Khǒr Royal Cup, Khor Royal Cup and Ngor Royal Cup. Because the FAT added teams from the Recruitment Team leagues, teams 32 To 47 had to face a Qualifying Round before entering the First Round proper.

First round

Second round

Third round

Fourth round

Quarter-finals

Semi-finals

Final

Awards
 MVP:
 Top Scorer:

See also
Thai Premier League
Thai Division 1 League
Regional League Division 2
Kor Royal Cup

References

External links
 Official website

1
2009